Mary Lowe may refer to:

 Mary Johnson Lowe (1924–1999), an American judge
 Mary Lowe (Guernsey politician), representing the parish of Vale in the legislature from 1994 to 2020
 Mary Lowe Dickinson (1839–1914), an American writer and activist
 Mary Lowe Good (1931–2019), an American chemist